A River Runs Through It can refer to:

 A River Runs Through It (novel), or A River Runs Through It and Other Stories, a collection of stories by Norman Maclean
 A River Runs Through It (film), a 1992 film based on the book